Nuraliza Osman (born 1977) is a Singaporean lawyer and beauty queen who represented her country at the Miss Universe 2002 pageant in Bayamón, Puerto Rico. Known affectionately as "Nura", she is of  Dutch, Chinese, Indian and Indonesian descent.

Biography
Nuraliza Osman grew up in Singapore and was a top student and scholar at the Methodist Girls School where she won many accolades and excelled academically. She then attended Victoria Junior College where she studied pre-medicine classes and French. She is described by her peers as a funny, lovely, independent and determined person who was well-loved.

Osman studied law at the National University of Singapore and in the United States.

Osman joined the Miss Singapore Universe 2002 pageant and won the title and the right to represent Singapore at the Miss Universe 2002 pageant in Puerto Rico. She is the only Malay delegate who represented Singapore in recent times.

Osman was active in television from 2003. She was awarded the Best Newcomer actress in 2004 and hosted the first Malay women's talk show in 2017.

After her reign as Miss Singapore Universe, she continued her law studies in New York and returned to Singapore thereafter to pursue her career in law as a civil litigator for the leading law firm of Rajah and Tann. She was nominated Young Lawyer of the Year by the Law Society of Singapore and has remained a successful lawyer to date.

In 2012, she represented Singapore as an athlete in freediving where she set a record for her country in a depth discipline. She is the author of a series of children's books on marine wildlife and the importance of conservation.

She has remained active in her community and is known for her intellectual image and for her contributions as a volunteer and director of various charities including the Make A Wish Foundation. In 2018, she was named as one of 10 influential women by GIC Singapore.

She speaks English, Malay, Bahasa Indonesia, French, German, Dutch, and Spanish.

References

External links 
 A Beautiful Mind
 Beauty queens should do more for pageant
 Nuraliza Osman's Miss Singapore-Universe profile
 https://web.archive.org/web/20140505002910/http://www.divaasia.com/media_photo/19758

1977 births
Living people
Miss Universe 2002 contestants
Singaporean beauty pageant winners
21st-century Singaporean lawyers
Singaporean people of Dutch descent
Singaporean people of Indian descent
Singaporean people of Indonesian descent
Singaporean people of Chinese descent
Singaporean people of Portuguese descent
Singaporean women lawyers
University of Pennsylvania alumni
Victoria Junior College alumni